Esrange Space Center (short form Esrange) is a rocket range and research centre located about 40 kilometers east of the town of Kiruna in northern Sweden. It is a base for scientific research with high-altitude balloons, investigation of the aurora borealis, sounding rocket launches, and satellite tracking, among other things. Located 200 km north of the Arctic Circle and surrounded by a vast wilderness, its geographic location is ideal for many of these purposes.

Esrange was built in 1964 by ESRO, the European Space Research Organisation, which later became European Space Agency by merging with ELDO, the European Launcher Development Organisation. The first rocket launch from Esrange occurred on 19 November 1966. In 1972, ownership was transferred to the newly started Swedish Space Corporation.

History
In the 1960s Esrange was established as an ESRO sounding rocket launching range located in Kiruna (Sweden). This location was chosen because it was generally agreed that it was important to carry out a sounding rocket programme in the auroral zone, and for this reason it was essential that ESRO equip itself with a suitable range in the northern latitudes. Access to Kiruna was good by air, road and rail, and the launching range was relatively close to the town of Kiruna. Finally and perhaps decisively, Esrange could be located near Kiruna Geophysical Observatory (subsequently renamed to Swedish Institute of Space Physics). In 1972 ownership and operations of the range was transferred to the Swedish Space Corporation.

Name
The name of the facility was originally ESRANGE, which was an abbreviation for ESRO Sounding Rocket Launching Range.

When Swedish Space Corporation took over the range, its name became Esrange (with capital 'E' only).

Esrange Space Center is the name that is currently used for the facility.

Other ways to interpret the name over the years has been European Space and Sounding Rocket Range, and European Space Range.

Rocket activities
There had been Swedish rocket activities previously, mainly at Kronogård (18 launches in the period 1961–1964). However, the rocket activity in Sweden did not gain thrust until after ESRO established Esrange in 1964.

During the period 1966–1972 ESRO launched more than 150 rockets from Esrange. Most of these were Centaure, Nike Apache, and Skua rockets reaching 100–220 km altitude. They supported many branches of European research, but the emphasis was on atmospheric and ionospheric research.

In 1972 the management of Esrange was transferred to the Swedish Space Corporation (SSC). Gradually the smaller rockets were complemented by larger rockets reaching higher altitudes, achieving weightlessness for a few minutes when the rocket is above the parts of the atmosphere giving an appreciable friction. Three main programmes, Texus, Maser, and Maxus currently dominate the rocket activities at Esrange and support microgravity research for ESA and DLR:

SSC, jointly with DLR, introduced a new launch service with the Suborbital Express programme launched in 2019. Suborbital Express is now integrating the Maser microgravity programme.

More than 500 rockets have been launched from Esrange since 1966. For information on individual rockets, see the List of rockets launched from Esrange.

Esrange has six launchers:
 MAXUS launcher (used for the CASTOR 4B rocket)
 MAN launcher (owned by DLR)
 MRL Launcher (used for the Orion, Nike-Orion, Taurus-Orion, Nike-Black Brant V, Terrier-Black brant rockets)
 Skylark launch tower (used for the VSB 30 rocket)
 FFAR launcher (used for Folding Fin Aircraft Rockets)
 SULO/VIPER launcher (used for Super Loki and VIPER rockets)

Balloon activities
Since 1974, more than 500 high-altitude balloons have been launched from Esrange for research purposes. The launch pad can handle balloons with volumes exceeding 1 million cubic meters.

Satellite services
The arctic latitude of Esrange makes it very suitable for communication with satellites in polar orbits. Esrange Satellite Station is part of a global network with stations in Canada, Alaska, Hawaii, Chile and Australia. This global network is managed from Esrange. 

Esrange Space Center satellite station emphasizes on data acquisition and processing for remote sensing and scientific missions as well as TT&C support. The station is often used in combination with SSC's Inuvik Satellite Station in northern Canada, to increase coverage opportunities for polar orbiting missions.

Esrange Space Center satellite station includes six independent Telemetry Tracking & Command (TT&C) systems in S-Band (one with receive capability also in the UHF-Band), six multi-frequency receive antenna systems in S/X-Band and an operational building which houses reception system electronics and data processing equipment. Satellite services at Esrange began in 1978.

Satellite control services
A number of telecommunication satellites have been controlled through Esrange:
 Tele-X (1989–1998)
 Sirius-1 (1995–2003)
 Sirius-2 (1997–2009)
 Sirius-3 (1998–2015)
 Sirius-4 (2008–)
 
Most research satellites of the Swedish space programme have received control commands through Esrange:
 Viking (1986–1987)
 Freja (1992–1996)
 Astrid-1 (1995)
 Odin (2001–)

The exception was controlled from SSC's laboratories in Solna outside Stockholm:
 Astrid-2 (1998–1999)

Ground station services
Data have been received at Esrange from more than 50 satellites, including SPOT 1–5, Landsat 2–7, ERS-1–2 and Envisat.

Satellite launch capability

Ideas to use Esrange Space Center for orbital launches has existed since the inauguration of the base in 1966, then in the vision of ESRO. As new smaller launcher projects started to emerge in the beginning of the new millennia, SSC started to form new ideas to use these to obtain an orbital capability.

On October 14, 2020, Matilda Ernkrans, the Swedish Space Minister, announced the decision of the Swedish government to establish capability to launch small satellites from Esrange Space Center in northern Sweden.

The orbital launch site, LC-3, was inagurated on 13 January 2023 as the ribbon was cut by the Swedish king Carl XVI Gustaf, prime minister Ulf Kristersson together with head commisioner President Ursula Von der Leyen. There are currently plans for an orbital launch at the end of 2023.

See also
List of rockets launched from Esrange
Swedish Space Corporation
Swedish National Space Agency
Swedish Institute of Space Physics
North European Aerospace Test range
List of rocket launch sites
Rexus/Bexus

References

Footnotes

Sources
 The History of Sounding Rockets and Their Contribution to European Space Research, Günther Seibert, ESA HSR-38, November 2006, .

External links

Esrange Space Center
List of stratospheric balloons launched from Esrange
Swedish Space Corporation - Official site

European Space Agency
Spaceflight
Spaceports in Europe
Rocket launch sites
Science and technology in Sweden
Space programme of Sweden
Kiruna
Buildings and structures in Norrbotten County
1966 establishments in Sweden